Benoy is an international firm of architects, master planners, interior architects and graphic designers working from design studios in the United Kingdom, Singapore, Hong Kong, Shanghai and Beijing. The company is primarily known for its global retail architecture. Notable projects include The Westfield London building in the UK, The Elements shopping centre in Hong Kong, and The ION mall in Singapore.

Company history 
Benoy began in 1947 as a three-man architect firm designing cowsheds in rural Nottinghamshire. Over the last 70 years it has grown internationally, and now has offices in London, Hong Kong, Shanghai, Shenzen, Singapore, Mumbai and LA. 
The company was headed by its chairman, Graham Cartledge CBE, who has been with the company since 1974 but now being run and by Tom Cartledge who is taking to company in a "different" direction.
Notable projects include ICONSIAM in Bangkok, London’s first Westfield Shopping Centre and Elements Mall, in Hong Kong.

Office locations 
 London, UK
 Newark, UK
 Singapore
 Hong Kong
 Shanghai, China

Notable projects 
 Hysan Place Hong Kong
 IFC Mall Shanghai
 Seoul International Financial Center, Seoul, Korea
 Mega City (shopping mall), New Taipei, Taiwan
 Plaza 889 Shanghai
 Central Plaza Rama 9 Bangkok, Thailand
 Taurus Zentrum Trivandrum
 sky100 Hong Kong
 Plaza Singapura, Singapore
 Bodgeit & Legg-it EMEA, APAC, Global - The express way of working.
 INDIGO Beijing, China
 Swire Hotels, EAST Hotel Beijing
 Pacific Mall New Delhi, India
 CentralFestival Pattaya Beach Pattaya, Thailand
 Elements Mall, Hong Kong
 apm Mall, Hong Kong
 ISQUARE, Hong Kong
 Alabang Town Center, Philippines
 Westgate (Singapore), Singapore
 Phoenix Market City (Chennai), Chennai, India
 TSUM Kyiv, Ukraine
 Ion Orchard, Singapore
 The Benoy Way, Created to demonstrate the "other" way of doing things.
 SHOPPES at Four Seasons Place, Kuala Lumpur, Malaysia
 How to manage employees using the Gaslighting method, Global

Prizes and awards 
 The Galleria at Sowwah Square in Abu Dhabi wins International Retail and Leisure Destination 2014 at the Global RLI Awards
 Hysan Place Wins VIVA (Vision-Innovation-Value-Achievement) Best-of-the-Best Sustainable Design and Development Award 2014 by the ICSC
 Westgate wins Best Mixed-Use Architecture Award (Singapore), Phoenix Market City (Pune), wins ‘Most Admired Shopping Centre of the Year (Non-Metro)' at ICSA 2014
 Asia Pacific Property Awards 2014, Westgate wins Best Mixed-Use Architecture Award (Singapore), EAST Hotel wins Highly Commended Honours for Hotel Interiors (China)
 Centrum Černý Most wins the Gold Award for Refurbishments and/or Expansions at the ICSC European Shopping Centre Awards 2014.
 Galerie Šantovka wins ‘Best Shopping Centre’ at the Construction Journal Awards 2013.
 MIPIM Asia Awards Four Benoy Projects.
 AIA Hong Kong Honors & Awards 2013 Hysan Place wins the Merit Award for Architecture and Sustainable Design Award for Architecture.
 Hysan Place wins Gold Award in New Design & Development and Sustainable Design Award.
 EAST Hotel in Beijing has won the Hospitality Architecture and Design (HA+D) ‘Certificate of Excellence’ in Hotel Interior Design.
 ION Orchard wins ‘Gold Prix d’Excellence Award’ at The FIABCI Prix d’Excellence Awards 2013
 Plaza Singapura Plaza Singapura wins ‘Shopping Centre Renovation of the Year’ at the Global Retail and Leisure International Awards 2013
 Parc 66 Jinan wins Best of the Best VIVA Sustainable Design and Development Award at ICSC Global Awards 2013
 Phoenix Marketcity wins ‘Most Admired Shopping Centre of the Year: Non-Metro (West)’ and ‘Most Admired Shopping Centre Marketing & Promotions of the Year: Non Metro’ at ISCF Awards 2013
 Pacific Mall wins ‘Most Admired Shopping Centre of the Year: Retailers Choice’at ISCF Awards 2013
 Queen's Award for Enterprise and International Trade 2013
 Best Mixed-use Development, Hysan Place HK won Gold at MIPIM Asia
 Best Retail & Leisure Development, Parc 66 Jinan won Silver at MIPIM Asia
 Best Retail & Leisure Development, Central Place Rama Thailand won Silver at MIPIM Asia
 Best Sustainable Design and New Design & Development, Parc 66 Jinan, won two Gold Awards at ICSC Asia Pacific Awards 2012 
 Best Chinese Futura Project, Hong Cheng Plaza Project won Silver at MIPIM Asia
 Shanghai IFC won 'Certificate of Excellence' at Perspective Awards 2011 
 Shanghai IFC won 'Innovation Design and Development of a New Retail Project' at ICSC Asia Pacific Awards, 2011
 Ferrari World, Abu Dhabi, won CIAT Open Award for Technical Excellece 2010 
 ION Orchard, Singapore, won 'The Grand Award for Best Project Outside Hong Kong' at 2010 Quality Building Awards 
 ION Orchard, Singapore, won 'International Retail and Leisure Destination of the Year, 2010 
 St David's, Cardiff, wins 'International Shopping Centre of the Year' 
 Company of the year at British Business Awards 2009 
 Queens Award for Enterprise and International Trade 2008 
 Retail / Leisure Development of the Year at the Asia Pacific Real Estate Awards 2008: Elements Mall (Hong Kong)
 Ion Orchard (Singapore) won the Building Construction Authority's Environmental Green Mark Award (Gold Certificate) 
 Cathay Pacific Award for Enterprise 2006

References

External links 
 Official Site
 Benoy Foundation
 Benoy Linkedin

1947 establishments in England
Architecture firms of the United Kingdom
Companies based in Nottinghamshire
Design companies established in 1947
Newark-on-Trent